Asenso Pinoy was a Philippine weekly magazine program hosted by Francis Cardona. It was aired on A2Z Channel 11, the show presented livelihood information, including technological breakthroughs in agriculture. It's been a progressive entrepreneurship-oriented show incorporating features in travel and tourism, culture and the arts, and stories of the micro entrepreneurs.

This program has been going for the last six years.

Host
Francis Cardona

Production
In March 2020, production was halted due to the enhanced community quarantine in Luzon caused by the COVID-19 pandemic.

On November 14, 2020, the production resumed but taped before the pandemic and aired on A2Z Channel 11 every Saturday mornings at 6:30 am.

References

External links
 

Philippine television shows
2005 Philippine television series debuts
2023 Philippine television series endings
IBC News and Public Affairs shows
Intercontinental Broadcasting Corporation original programming
TV5 (Philippine TV network) original programming
Studio 23 original programming
People's Television Network original programming
ABS-CBN Sports and Action original programming
Filipino-language television shows
Television productions suspended due to the COVID-19 pandemic